Treklyano Municipality (trl Obština Trekljano) is a municipality in Kyustendil Province, Bulgaria. The administrative centre is Treklyano.

Demographics
According to the 2021 Census, the municipality of Treklyano has only 434 inhabitants living in 19 small villages.

Religion 
According to the latest Bulgarian census of 2011, the religious composition, among those who answered the optional question on religious identification, was the following:

References 

Municipalities in Kyustendil Province